George Hulme was a footballer who played at full-back for Burslem Port Vale in the late 1890s.

Career
Hulme probably joined Burslem Port Vale in 1896, his debut coming in a 7–2 Midland League defeat at Barnsley St. Peter's on 23 January 1897. He played eight Second Division and two FA Cup games in the 1898–99 season, but in February 1899, he broke a leg. This finished his career, at least at the Athletic Ground.

Career statistics
Source:

References

Year of birth missing
Year of death missing
English footballers
Association football fullbacks
Port Vale F.C. players
Midland Football League players
English Football League players